Cobîlea is a village in Șoldănești District, Moldova. The village is mentioned in a document dating to 1482.

Legend placed here a wooden church established by Stephen III of Moldavia in 1484. In the front of the present church, dated 1822, is an oak tree that is over 700 years old.

References

Villages of Șoldănești District
Soroksky Uyezd